The 29th Annual GMA Dove Awards were held on April 25, 1997, recognizing accomplishments of musicians for the year 1996. The show was held at the Nashville Arena in Nashville, Tennessee, and was hosted by Gary Chapman and CeCe Winans.

Award recipients

Artists
Artist of the Year
Steven Curtis Chapman
Male Vocalist of the Year
Steven Curtis Chapman
Female Vocalist of the Year
CeCe Winans
Group of the Year
Jars of Clay
New Artist of the Year
Jaci Velasquez
Songwriter of the Year
Steven Curtis Chapman
Producer of the Year
Charlie Peacock

Songs

Song of the Year
"Butterfly Kisses"; Bob Carlisle, Randy Thomas
Contemporary Gospel Recorded Song of the Year
"Take Me Back"; Tribute - The Songs of Andraé Crouch; CeCe Winans
Country Recorded Song of the Year
"Somebody Was Prayin' for Me"; Steel Witness; Charlie Daniels
Inspirational Recorded Song of the Year
"Butterfly Kisses"; Butterfly Kisses (Shades of Grace); Bob Carlisle
Modern Rock Recorded Song of the Year
"Epidermis Girl"; Space; Bleach
Pop/Contemporary Recorded Song of the Year
"Between You and Me"; Jesus Freak; dc Talk
Rock Recorded Song of the Year
"Like It, Love It, Need It"; Jesus Freak; dc Talk
Southern Gospel Recorded Song of the Year
"Only God Knows"; Wherever You Are; The Martins
Traditional Gospel Recorded Song of the Year
"Stop by the Church"; Heritage of Faith; Babbie Mason
Urban Recorded Song of the Year
"Under the Influence"; Under the Influence; Anointed

Albums
Contemporary Gospel Album of the Year
Whatcha Lookin' 4; Kirk Franklin & the Family
Country Album of the Year
Little Bit of Faith; Jeff Silvey
Inspirational Album of the Year
My Utmost for His Highest: Quiet Prayers; Bryan Duncan
Modern Rock Album of the Year
Free Flying Soul; The Choir
Pop/Contemporary Album of the Year
Signs of Life; Steven Curtis Chapman
Praise and Worship Album of the Year
Welcome Home; Ron Kenoly
Rap/Hip Hop Album of the Year
Erace; The Gotee Brothers
Rock Album of the Year
Jesus Freak; dc Talk
Southern Gospel Album of the Year
Wherever You Are; The Martins
Special Event Album of the Year
Tribute - The Songs of Andraé Crouch; CeCe Winans, Michael W. Smith, Twila Paris, Bryan Duncan, Wayne Watson, The Winans, Clay Crosse, Take 6, The Brooklyn Tabernacle Choir, First Call, Andraé Crouch and the All-Star Choir
Traditional Gospel Album of the Year
Just a Word; Shirley Caesar's Outreach Convention Choir
Children's Album of the Year
A Very Veggie Christmas; VeggieTales; Phil Vischer, Kurt Heinecke, Mike Nawrocki
Youth/Children's Musical of the Year
Candy Cane Lane; Celeste and David T. Clydesdale
Choral Collection of the Year
My Tribute - Celebrating the Songs of Andraé Crouch; Dale Mathews, John DeVries
Instrumental Album of the Year
The Players; Michael Omartian, Dann Huff, Tommy Sims, Tom Hemby, Terry McMillan, Chris Rodriguez, Shane Keister, Mark Douthit, Eric Darken
Musical of the Year
Make Us One; Babbie Mason, Kenny Mann, David T. Clydesdale
Recorded Music Packaging of the Year
Take Me to Your Leader; Toni Fitzpenn - art direction; George Barris, Michael Wilson, Norman Jean Roy - photographers; Joel Anderson - design; Newsboys

Videos
Short Form Music Video of the Year
"Jesus Freak"; dc Talk; Steve Strachen; Simon Maxwell
Long Form Music Video of the Year
Roadwork; Geoff Moore & The Distance; Darlene Brock, Gael Van Sant; Tom Bevins

References 

GMA Dove Awards
1997 music awards
1997 in American music
1997 in Tennessee
GMA